Pannithittu is a village in Bahour Commune of Bahour taluk  in the Union Territory of Puducherry, India.  It lies east of NH-45A at a distance of 2 km from it.  River Malattar joins Bay of Bengal at Pannithittu.

Geography
Pannithittu is bordered by  Kirumampakkam in the west, Malattar in the north, Bay of Bengal in east and Pillaiyarkuppam in the south.

Villages
Following are the villages under Pannithittu Village Panchayat.

 Pannithittu 
 Aladimedu
 Etchangadu
 Vambapet

Road network
Pannithittu is connected to Puducherry by NH45A - Kirumampakkam road. Also Pannithittu is connected to Pudukuppam via. Pillaiyarkuppam, Bahour and Manappattu. There is also an access road from Reddichavadi via Pannithittu Regulator.

Gallery

Politics
Pannithittu is  a part of Embalam (Union Territory Assembly constituency) which comes under Puducherry (Lok Sabha constituency)

References

External links
 Official website of the Government of the Union Territory of Puducherry

Villages in Puducherry district